Eugene Burger (June 1, 1939 – August 8, 2017) was an American magician. He was born in 1939 and was based in Chicago, Illinois. He was reputed for his close-up skills and his work in mentalism and bizarre magic.

Burger was also a philosopher and a historian of religion. He had degrees in philosophy and earned a Bachelor of Divinity degree in 1964 from Yale University and taught university courses in comparative religion and philosophy.

Burger frequently taught at the McBride Magic & Mystery School in Las Vegas, Nevada.

He was the author of books on the presentation of close up magic and was featured on several instructional DVDs and videos for magicians.  He produced an audio program called Growing in the Art of Magic.

Eugene died of cancer in Chicago on August 8, 2017. He was 78.

Books and DVDs 
 "Secrets and Mysteries for the Close-Up Entertainer" (1982)
 Intimate Power (1983)
 The Experience of Magic (1989)
 Strange Ceremonies (1991)
 Spirit Theater (1986)
 The Performance of Close-Up Magic (1987)
 Meaning and Magic (expanded)
 Mastering the Art of Magic
 Mystery School (2003) with Jeff McBride
 Eugene Goes Bizarre
 Real Magic
 Gourmet Closeup Magic
 Eugene Burger's Magical Voyages
 Eugene Burger Presents Exploring Magical Presentation
 A Magical Vision (Documentary on Eugene Burger, written and directed by Michael Caplan)
 Final Secrets by Lawrence Hass and Eugene Burger

Notable appearances in print
In 1982, Burger was featured on the cover of The Linking Ring magazine.

Awards 
Burger was considered "one of the 100 most influential magicians of the 20th century" by MAGIC Magazine.

In 2012, the Fédération Internationale des Sociétés Magiques (FISM) presented him with a special award for Magic Theory.

References

External links
 Official Eugene Burger homepage

1939 births
2017 deaths
American magicians
People from Chicago
Yale Divinity School alumni
Academy of Magical Arts Close-Up Magician of the Year winners
Academy of Magical Arts Lecturer of the Year winners
Academy of Magical Arts Performing Fellowship winners